The Last Woman is a 1976 French-Italian film directed by Marco Ferreri and starring Gérard Depardieu and Ornella Muti.

Depardieu was nominated for best actor for his role in the César ceremony in 1977.

Plot  
Gérard is an engineer who is married to Gabrielle and has a nine-month-old son, for whom he cares deeply. When his wife leaves him for feminist reasons, he is left with custody of their son. To satisfy his romantic longings, Gerard embarks on an affair with Valérie, his son's daycare worker. However, Gabrielle fights for custody of the child, and when Gérard's affair with Valérie threatens his custody chances, Gérard responds by mutilating himself.

Cast 
 Ornella Muti : Valérie
 Gérard Depardieu : Gérard
 Michel Piccoli : Michel
 Renato Salvatori : René
 Giuliana Calandra : Benoîte
 Zouzou : Gabrielle
 Benjamin Labonnelie : Pierrot
 Nathalie Baye : The girl with cherries

External links 

1976 films
1976 drama films
1970s French-language films
French drama films
Italian drama films
Films directed by Marco Ferreri
Films scored by Philippe Sarde
Films with screenplays by Rafael Azcona
1970s French films
1970s Italian films